Juan Pablo Niño Castellano (born 15 May 1978) is a Spanish retired footballer who played as a left winger.

Club career
Born in Rota, Cádiz, Andalusia, Niño graduated from local Real Betis' youth system, making his debut with the reserves in the 1997–98 season, in Segunda División B. In the summer of 2000 he was loaned to Recreativo de Huelva of Segunda División, playing his first match as a professional on 3 September by coming on as a second-half substitute in a 0–0 home draw against CD Badajoz.

Niño appeared in 16 games during the campaign, starting in only one however. In July 2001 he moved to third-level club Cádiz CF also in a temporary deal, featuring regularly and being loaned to Eredivisie side RBC Roosendaal in July 2003.

In August 2004, profiting from Denílson's injury, Niño was promoted to the first team in La Liga. He made his debut in the competition on 16 October, replacing Edu in a 1–1 home draw to Real Madrid.

In December 2005, after being rarely used, Niño joined CD Numancia on loan for the remainder of the season. On 4 August of the following year, he terminated his contract with Betis and signed for Mérida UD in the third tier.

Niño moved to Tercera División's CD Pozoblanco in 2007, and went on to spend the rest of his career in the lower leagues and amateur football, representing Puerto Real CF, Real Balompédica Linense and CD Rota.

Honours
Betis
Copa del Rey: 2004–05

References

External links

1978 births
Living people
People from Rota, Andalusia
Sportspeople from the Province of Cádiz
Spanish footballers
Footballers from Andalusia
Association football wingers
La Liga players
Segunda División players
Segunda División B players
Tercera División players
Betis Deportivo Balompié footballers
Real Betis players
Recreativo de Huelva players
Cádiz CF players
CD Numancia players
Mérida UD footballers
Real Balompédica Linense footballers
Eredivisie players
RBC Roosendaal players
Spanish expatriate footballers
Expatriate footballers in the Netherlands
Spanish expatriate sportspeople in the Netherlands